Joshua Alexander Flitter (born August 25, 1994) is an American actor. He is known for playing Corky in Nancy Drew, Eddie in The Greatest Game Ever Played, and voiced Rudy Kangaroo in the 2008 animated film Horton Hears a Who! and Budderball in the Air Buddies movies.

Life and career
Flitter was born on August 25, 1994 in Ridgewood, New Jersey to parents Carla, who appeared in Broadway and regional musicals, and Steve. Josh attended Marlboro High School and graduated in 2012. In 2016, he graduated from New York City's School of Visual Arts with a major in filmmaking. As of 2020, Flitter ran a Twitter account, in which he produced short vlogs and sketch videos. He regularly states to his viewers that he wishes to one day return to his childhood stardom.

Filmography

Movies

Television

References

External links

Josh Flitter Official Website
Flitter Freaks
Interview with Josh Flitter on MouseClubhouse.com

1994 births
Living people
21st-century American male actors
American male child actors
American male film actors
American male television actors
American male voice actors
Male actors from New Jersey
Marlboro High School alumni
People from Marlboro Township, New Jersey
People from Ridgewood, New Jersey